The Ministry of Water Supply (Nepali: खानेपानी मन्त्रालय) is a government ministry of Nepal that is responsible to provide effective, sustainable and quality water supply and sanitation to the people of Nepal.

History
The Ministry was established in 1972 by the Government of Nepal as the Department of Water Supply and Sewerage under the Ministry of Water Resources. Before it became a ministry, it was working under the Ministry of Housing and Physical Planning and the Ministry of Physical Planning and Works. In 2018, under the second Oli cabinet, the portfolio of the ministry was changed to its current form, Ministry of Water Supply.

Organisational structure
The Ministry of Water Supply has several departments and subdivisions to facilitate and implement its work:

 Department of Water Supply and Sewerage
 Melamchi Water Supply Development Board
 Project Implementation Directorate
 Kathmandu Valley Water Supply Management Board
 Nepal Water Supply Corporation
 Kathmandu Upatyaka Khanepani Limited
 Rural Water Supply and Sanitation Fund Development Board
 Water Supply Tariff Fixation Commission

Former Ministers of Water Supply
This is a list of former Ministers of Water Supply (or equivalent) since the Nepalese Constituent Assembly election in 2013:

References

External links
 Official website

Government of Nepal
Government ministries of Nepal
Nepal
Water supply and sanitation in Nepal